South Somerset is a local government district in Somerset, England.

The South Somerset district covers an area of  ranging from the borders with Devon, Wiltshire and Dorset to the edge of the Somerset Levels. It has a population of approximately 158,000. The administrative centre of the district is Yeovil.

On 1 April 2023, the district will be abolished and replaced by a new unitary district for the area at present served by Somerset County Council.  The new council will be known as Somerset Council.

History

The district was formed on 1 April 1974, and was originally known as Yeovil, adopting its present name in 1985.  It was formed by the merger of the municipal boroughs of Chard, Yeovil, along with Crewkerne and Ilminster urban districts and the Chard Rural District, Langport Rural District, Wincanton Rural District and Yeovil Rural District.

The district covers the whole of the Yeovil constituency, and part of Somerton and Frome.  The district is governed by the South Somerset District Council, last elected in the 2019 South Somerset District Council election.  It is currently Liberal Democrat controlled, and has Beacon Council status.

Abolition
On 1 April 2023, the district council will be abolished and replaced by a new unitary authority for the area at present served by Somerset County Council.  The new council will be known as Somerset Council.
Elections for the new council took place in May 2022. Since then it has been running alongside South Somerset and the other district councils in the county until their abolition.

Towns

Its main towns include:

Bruton
Castle Cary
Chard
Crewkerne
Ilminster
Langport
Milborne Port
Somerton
Wincanton
Yeovil

Wards

The electoral wards include: Camelot and Wessex.

Parishes

Major roads
 A30
 A37
 A303
 A357

Railway stations
Bruton (Heart of Wessex Line and Reading to Taunton Line), Great Western Railway
Castle Cary (Heart of Wessex Line and Reading to Taunton Line), Great Western Railway
Crewkerne (West of England Main Line), South Western Railway
Templecombe (West of England Main Line), South Western Railway
Yeovil Junction (West of England Main Line), South Western Railway
Yeovil Pen Mill (Heart of Wessex Line), Great Western Railway

Heritage Railways
Chard branch line, former Great Western Railway line between Chard and Taunton
Yeovil Railway Centre

Education

County schools (those which are not independent) in the five non-metropolitan districts of the county are operated by Somerset County Council.

For a full list of schools see: List of schools in Somerset

See also

 Grade I listed buildings in South Somerset

References

External links
South Somerset District Council

 
Non-metropolitan districts of Somerset